Rafferty's Rules is an Australian television drama series which ran from 1987 to 1991 on the Seven Network.

The producers of the series were Posie Graeme-Evans (1987–1988), and Denis Phelen. The directors were Graham Thorburn, Mike Smith and Russell Webb. The writers were David Allen, John Upton, Tim Gooding and David Marsh.

Rafferty's Rules was one of the first programs undertaken by the Seven Network's then new in-house drama unit, going into production in May 1985 as "a 15-part courtroom drama". The program had started out as a pilot episode, recorded in early 1984 with the actor Chris Haywood in the lead role. When the pilot episode was remounted later in 1984, Chris Haywood wasn't available and the lead role was re-cast to John Wood. This second recording was eventually broadcast as the program's first episode. Initially it was hoped that the program would make its debut during the 1985 ratings season and there was an option to extend the series to 26 episodes if the initial response was positive.

By mid-1986, the media was asking questions as to why the series, "which had more pilots than TAA", had yet to appear. On Sunday 15 June 1986, The Sun-Herald TV Guide said, "The series was made last year and scripting of a new series has almost been completed".

Rafferty's Rules eventually debuted on the Seven Network in February 1987.

The series was also shown in New Zealand on TV3 in 1989, and in the UK on Satellite channel Lifestyle in 1991. In New Zealand, it was shown Fridays at 9:30pm. In the UK, it was shown daily at 14:00.

In Australia, the series was last replayed nationally at 3pm weekdays in 2006 on the Seven Network, although not entirely. Prior to that, Seven broadcast the series at the 10-11am weekday timeslot in the late 1990s. More recently, the series was available on the 7plus "on-demand" service.

Awards
John Wood received the Logie Award for Most Outstanding Actor in both 1988 and 1989, and Catherine Wilkin received the Logie Award for Most Outstanding Actress in 1988.

Rafferty's Rules was named Best Drama Series at the 1988 Penguin Awards, while Peter Carroll won Best Actor in a Series and Michael Cove won Best Scriptwriter for Drama Series.

Plot
Michael Aloysius Rafferty, who is a stipendiary magistrate, drives to work in an old blue VW Kombi van. He owns a cat named Rhubarb.

Rafferty is separated from his wife, with whom he had two children (a son and a daughter).

Rafferty also has an older daughter, Rebecca Browning, who is in her early twenties — and of whose existence he was unaware until she contacted him after she had grown up. (Rebecca's mother is a woman who Michael Rafferty had known before he met his wife, and who he had not seen since his marriage.)

Rafferty also has a brother, Patrick Rafferty, who is a state Member of Parliament.

Cast
 John Wood as "Michael Rafferty, S.M."
 Simon Chilvers as "Sgt. Julian Flicker - Police Prosecutor"
 Arky Michael as "Fulvio Frangellomini - Court Clerk"
 Terry Serio as "Bomber Clayton - Police Prosecutor"
 Andrew McFarlane as "Sgt. Gibson - Police Prosecutor"
 Catherine Wilkin as "Paulyne Gray - Public Defender"
 Katy Brinson as "Lisa Blake - Public Defender"
 Lisa Crittenden as "Sandra Frangellomini"

Guest stars
 Patrick Phillips as "Young Solicitor"
 Alan Lovell as "Police Constable Evans"
 Rebecca Rigg as "Rebecca Browning" (Michael Rafferty's elder daughter)
 Paul Chubb as "Patrick Rafferty" (a Member of Parliament, he is Michael Rafferty's brother)
 Ernie Dingo as "Wayne Williams"
 Alwyn Kurts as "George Bradstock"
 Peter Hayes (Australian actor) as "Peter Booth"
 Peter Greenwood as Football thug
 Jon English in one episode in Season Two, Episode 2 as "David Anson"
 Geoff Morrell in one episode in Season 4, Episide 9 as "Alan Tillaman"

Series location
The series is based at a Magistrates' Court in Manly (a Sydney beachside suburb), over which Rafferty presided.

References

External links
 

1987 Australian television series debuts
1991 Australian television series endings
Australian drama television series
Australian legal television series
Television shows set in New South Wales